Joeropsididae is a family of crustaceans belonging to the order Isopoda.

Genera:
 Joeropsis Koehler, 1885
 Rugojoeropsis Just, 2001
 Scaphojoeropsis Just, 2001

References

Isopoda